The Rio dos Bois is a river of Goiás state in central Brazil. It flows into the São Simão reservoir, which is fed and drained by the Paranaíba River, near Inaciolândia.

See also
List of rivers of Goiás

References
Brazilian Ministry of Transport

Rivers of Goiás